The Proud Miss Stakes  is a South Australian Jockey Club Group 3 Thoroughbred horse race for fillies and mares aged three years old and upwards, at set weights with penalties conditions over a distance of 1200 metres at the Morphettville Racecourse Adelaide, Australia in the Autumn Carnival. Prize money is A$127,250.

History
The race is held on The Goodwood race card on the last day of the SAJC Autumn Carnival.

The race is named after the brilliant two year old South Australian filly, Proud Miss who won nine consecutive races before finishing second in the 1962 Golden Slipper Stakes.

Name
2004–2005 - Pink Diamond
2006 - Chrysler Jeep Stakes
2007 - AV Jennings Home Improvements Stakes 
2008 - Chrysler Jeep Dodge Stakes 
2009 - Proud Miss Stakes

Grade
2006–2013 - Listed Race
2014 onwards - Group 3

Winners

 2022 - Seradess
 2021 - Brooklyn Hustle
 2020 - Humma Humma
 2019 - Lady Cosmology
 2018 - She's So High
 2017 - Fuhryk
 2016 - Runway Star
 2015 - Hazard
 2014 - Miss Steele
 2013 - Assertive Eagle
 2012 - Bonnie Mac
 2011 - Dubleanny
 2010 - Hanabananah
 2009 - Burgeis
 2008 - Soaressa
 2007 - Zipanese
 2006 - Clear View
 2005 - Twinciti
 2004 - Ice Dancer

See also
 List of Australian Group races
 Group races

References

Horse races in Australia
Sprint category horse races for fillies and mares
Sport in Adelaide
Recurring sporting events established in 2004
2004 establishments in Australia